Nebraska State Teachers College may refer to:

 University of Nebraska at Kearney, Kearney, Nebraska, known as Nebraska State Teachers College, 1921–1963
 Peru State College, Peru, known as Nebraska State Teachers College at Peru, 1921–1949
 Wayne State College, Wayne, Nebraska, known as Nebraska State Teachers College at Wayne, 1949–1963
 Chadron State College, Chadron, Nebraska, known as Chadron State Teacher's College, 1921–1963